Saneh Kuh (also Romanized as Saneh Kūh; also known as Saneh Kū and Senūr) is a village in Kuhdasht-e Gharbi Rural District, in the Central District of Miandorud County, Mazandaran Province, Iran. At the 2006 census, its population was 80, in 22 families.

References 

Populated places in Miandorud County